Miss Grenada World  beauty pageant selects representatives for the Miss World pageant from Grenada, an island country in the Caribbean Sea. The winner receives nationwide media exposure, thousands of dollars in prizes, an all-expense-paid trip to the Miss World contest and the opportunity to travel the world to act as an ambassador for various charitable causes.

History

Miss Grenada was held for first time in 1964. The competition is run as a franchise and organized by a committee. The event organizers strive to increase the skill level and confidence of young Grenadian women. Christine Hughes was the first Miss Grenada 1964 and competed at Miss Universe 1964.

Miss World
Jennifer Hosten won the Miss World 1970 contest, representing Grenada. She became the first woman from her country to win the title. The whole contest had been controversial even before the result had been announced. Afterwards allegations were made about the influence of the Prime Minister of Grenada, who was on the judging panel.

Miss Grenada World
In 2007, Jennifer Hosten, Miss Grenada 1970, was granted the Miss Grenada World Franchise by the Miss World Organization. The event took place at Jenny's Place, a resort on the beach in Grand Anse and was sponsored by the Ministry of Tourism of Grenada and cosmetics company, Revlon.

Titleholders

References

External links
Official Site
 Miss Grenada World,  in 2007 - Vivian Burkhardt

Grenada
Grenada
Grenada
Recurring events established in 1964
Grenadian awards